Nicholas David Bills (born 16 February 1992) is a New South Wales cricket player. Bills made his first-class cricket debut on 10–13 March 2011 against Western Australia at the Sydney Cricket Ground. In his debut match, the right-arm medium pacer took 2 wickets for 95 runs. Major teams he has played for include New South Wales, New South Wales under 23s and North Sydney District Cricket Club.

See also
 List of New South Wales representative cricketers

References

1992 births
Living people
Australian cricketers
New South Wales cricketers
Sydney Thunder cricketers
Cricketers from Sydney